The 2016 Dow Corning Tennis Classic was a professional tennis tournament played on indoor hard courts. It was the twenty-second edition of the tournament and part of the 2016 ITF Women's Circuit, offering a total of $100,000 in prize money. It took place in Midland, Michigan, United States, on 1–7 February 2016.

Singles main draw entrants

Seeds 

 1 Rankings as of 18 January 2016.

Other entrants 
The following players received wildcards into the singles main draw:
  Robin Anderson
  Taylor Townsend

The following players received entry from the qualifying draw:
  Lauren Albanese
  Michaela Gordon
  Jamie Loeb
  Alexandra Sanford

The following player received entry by a special exempt:
  Raveena Kingsley

Champions

Singles

 Naomi Broady def.  Robin Anderson, 6–7(6–8), 6–0, 6–2

Doubles

 Catherine Bellis /  Ingrid Neel def.  Naomi Broady /  Shelby Rogers, 6–2, 6–4

External links 
 2016 Dow Corning Tennis Classic at ITFtennis.com
  

2016 ITF Women's Circuit
2016 in American tennis
2016